The sixth and final season of the television series Xena: Warrior Princess commenced airing in the United States and Canada on October 2, 2000 and concluded on June 18, 2001, and contained 22 episodes.

The sixth season aired in the United States on the USA Network. The season was released on DVD as a ten disc boxed set under the title of Xena: Warrior Princess: Season 6 on March 8, 2005 by Anchor Bay Entertainment.

Episodes

Production

Reception

Home media release

References

2000 American television seasons
2001 American television seasons
Xena: Warrior Princess seasons